Low Yeen Yuan (born 9 March 2002) is a Malaysian badminton player. In 2021, she won three titles (Slovenian International, Latvia International and Hellas International) together with Valeree Siow in the women's doubles event.

Achievements

BWF International Challenge/Series (3 titles, 1 runner-up) 
Women's doubles

Mixed doubles

  BWF International Challenge tournament
  BWF International Series tournament
  BWF Future Series tournament

References

External links 
 

Living people
2002 births
People from Negeri Sembilan
Malaysian sportspeople of Chinese descent
Malaysian female badminton players
21st-century Malaysian women